The 2010 Korfball Europa Cup is the main korfball competition for clubs in Europe in 2010.

First round
The first round took place in the weekend 3–4 October in Kocaeli (Turkey) and Třeboň (Czech Republic).

Final round
The final round was held in Herentals (Belgium) from January 20 to 23, 2010

7th-8th places

5th-6th places

3rd-4th places

FINAL

Final standings

External links
Europa Cup 2010 - First round Pool A
Europa Cup 2010 - First round Pool B
Europa Cup 2010 - Final round

Korfball Europa Cup
Korfball European Cup
2009 in korfball